In the context of the 2011 Egyptian revolution, an initiative was launched by the Government of Egypt during mid-2011 to draft what has been referred to as the "supra-constitutional principles".  A draft published on 1 November 2011 sought to grant the Supreme Council of the Armed Forces military autonomy from any oversight and a permanent power to intervene in politics. It also gave the military and/or judiciary broad powers over the upcoming processes of establishing a new parliament and passing a new constitution. In order to partly satisfy secular activists who had been demanding a new (non-Islamic) constitution before parliamentary elections, the principles included guarantees for fundamental citizenship rights. The principles became known as the El-Selmi document. It gave rise to renewed large scale protests and street fighting against the government in November 2011.

References 

Egyptian revolution of 2011
Politics of Egypt
Constitutions of Egypt
2011 documents